Jorge Alexis Amador Castellanos is a Mexican footballer who last played for Loros de la Universidad de Colima. He was born on December 8, 1991, in Manzanillo, Colima. Jorge's height is 174 cm and Weight is 74 kg. His position is forward.

References

External links 

 https://www.footballcritic.com/jorge-amador/profile/135798

1991 births
Living people
Association football forwards
Loros UdeC footballers
Ascenso MX players
Liga Premier de México players
Tercera División de México players
Footballers from Colima
Mexican footballers
Sportspeople from Manzanillo, Colima